Rock Haven is an unincorporated community in Meade County, in the U.S. state of Kentucky.

History
A post office called Rock Haven was established in 1848, and remained in operation until 1956. The community most likely was named for nearby rock outcroppings.

References

Unincorporated communities in Meade County, Kentucky
Unincorporated communities in Kentucky